Watson Labs may refer to:

 Thomas J. Watson Research Center, IBM Research Division headquarters
 Watson Pharmaceuticals, American pharmaceutical company